James Henderson Jr. (May 16, 1942 – December 30, 2022) was an American politician who was a member of the Arizona State Senate. He served seven terms in the Senate from January 1985 through January 1999, representing district 3.  He ran for an eighth term in 2000, but was narrowly defeated in the Democratic primary by Jack C. Jackson.

References

1942 births
2022 deaths
Democratic Party Arizona state senators
People from Ganado, Arizona